National Board of Examinations (NBE) is an autonomous body under the Ministry of Health and Family Welfare (India), Government of India, and established in 1975 at New Delhi as a Society under Delhi Society registration act, to standardizing postgraduate medical education and examination in India. 

The postgraduate degree awarded by the National Board of Examinations is called the Diplomate of National Board (DNB). The list of recognised qualifications awarded by the Board in various specialties and super-specialties are approved by the Government of India and are included in the First Schedule of Indian Medical Council Act, 1956. The National Board of Examinations conducts the largest portfolio of examinations in the field of medicine in India.

Examinations
The National Board of Examinations conducts the following examinations:

 DNB final (exit) examinations.
 Screening test for Indian Nationals with foreign medical graduate qualifications.(FMGE) 
 Fellowship Entrance and Exit examinations.
 NEET-PG for admission to MD/MS/DNB postgraduate medical courses across India 
 NEET-MDS for admission to postgraduate dental courses across India
 NEET-SS for admission to DM/Mch/DNB superspecialty medical courses across India 

The examinations are conducted as per the schedule of examinations notified in advance at the website www.natboard.edu.in

The screening test is governed by the screening test regulations as notified by the Medical Council of India with previous approval of Central Government of India and the judgments of the Supreme Court of India.

See also
The National Council for Human Resource in Health in India
All India Institute of Medical Sciences
Medical Council of India Screening Test
Compulsory Rotating Medical Internship

References

External links
National Board of Examinations - Official Website

Higher education in India
Medical education in India
Organizations established in 1975
Organisations based in Delhi
College accreditors in India
Examinations in India
Ministry of Health and Family Welfare
1975 establishments in Delhi